Grants Braes AFC is an amateur association football club in Dunedin, New Zealand.  

The Grants Braes AFC was founded as a Jnr Club on 11th of January 1961. The team colours were black, gold and white. Otago Football Association addressed the letter confirming the Affiliation to Mr J Paterson of Waverly, Dunedin.

The Foundation Team was an 8th Grade Side. The players on that team were Trevor Wilson, Bruce Wright, Alan Keane, Ken Sheal, Derek Stewart, Phillip McDonnell, Stuart Smith, John Frew, Ross McKay, Murry Urquhart, Graham Bulling and Paul Robertson. No coach was listed.

Junior club

Grants Braes entered 5 teams into the local 6th grade in 2019, 3 boys teams and 2 all girls sides. Further up the age grades Grants Braes AFC has an all girls team in the 11th grade. 
The Smurfettes won their league in 2019 and only lost one competition game the entire season. Grants Braes AFC Tomahawks entered into the local 14th grade competition in 2019.

Senior club

In 2019 Grants Braes AFC had 5 senior teams competing in the following leagues:

Men's Division 4 
Snr Woman's Division 2 
Masters Over 35s 
Masters Over 45s  

In 2020 Grants Braes AFC will look to expand teams into Snr Leagues, perhaps aiming to enter a Division 1 side, and more importantly keeping the numbers up in the junior teams.

References
 UltimateNZSoccer website's Grants Braes page

External links

Club website
Club Facebook Page

Association football clubs in Dunedin
Association football clubs established in 1961
1961 establishments in New Zealand